Elaheh Mohammadi is an Iranian journalist who reports on society and women's issues for the daily Ham-Mihan newspaper. She has also worked with state-controlled media outlets such as Shahrvand, Khabar Online and Etemad Online in the past years.

Mohammadi was arrested by Iranian security forces in September 2022 for reporting on Mahsa Amini's funeral.

Report on Mahsa Amini's funeral 
Mohammadi had traveled to Saqqez for Iran's Ham-Mihan newspaper to cover the funeral of Mahsa Amini, 22, who had spent three days in a coma following her arrest by Tehran's notorious morality police and died on 16 September. Mohammadi had reported about the police attack at the funeral.

Mohammadi was summoned by the judicial authorities but was then arrested by security forces on 29 September 2022, while on her way to the Ministry of Intelligence office for the questioning, according to Mohammad Ali Kamfiroozi, Mohammadi's lawyer, who broke the news on his page on social media.

See also 
 Compulsory Hijab in Iran
 Human rights in Iran
 Mahsa Amini protests
 Niloofar Hamedi

References 

Living people
Iranian journalists
Iranian women journalists
Iranian prisoners and detainees
Year of birth missing (living people)